Bart Denton Ehrman (born 1955) is an American New Testament scholar focusing on textual criticism of the New Testament, the historical Jesus, and the origins and development of early Christianity. He has written and edited 30 books, including three college textbooks. He has also authored six New York Times bestsellers. He is the James A. Gray Distinguished Professor of Religious Studies at the University of North Carolina at Chapel Hill.

Biography

Early life
Born on October 5, 1955, Ehrman grew up in Lawrence, Kansas, and attended Lawrence High School, where he was on the state champion debate team in 1973. He began studying the Bible, biblical theology, and biblical languages at Moody Bible Institute, where he earned the school's three-year diploma in 1976. He is a 1978 graduate of Wheaton College in Illinois, where he received his bachelor's degree. He received his PhD (in 1985) and MDiv from Princeton Theological Seminary, where he studied textual criticism of the Bible, development of the New Testament canon and New Testament apocrypha under Bruce Metzger. Both baccalaureate and doctorate were conferred magna cum laude.

Career
Ehrman was raised in an Anglican family and was originally a member of the Episcopal Church of the United States; as a teenager, he became a born-again evangelical. In Misquoting Jesus, he recounts being certain in his youthful enthusiasm that God had inspired the wording of the Bible and protected its texts from all error. His desire to understand the original words of the Bible led him to study ancient languages, particularly Koine Greek, and textual criticism. During such studies at Princeton, however, he became convinced that there are contradictions and discrepancies in the biblical manuscripts that could not be harmonized or reconciled:

He subsequently left evangelicalism and returned to the Episcopal Church, where he remained a liberal Christian for 15 years, but later became an agnostic atheist after struggling with the philosophical problems of evil and suffering.

Ehrman has taught at the University of North Carolina at Chapel Hill since 1988, after four years of teaching at Rutgers University. At UNC he has served as both the director of graduate studies and the chair of the Department of Religious Studies. He was the recipient of the 2009 J. W. Pope "Spirit of Inquiry" Teaching Award, the 1993 UNC Undergraduate Student Teaching Award, the 1994 Phillip and Ruth Hettleman Prize for Artistic and Scholarly Achievement, and the Bowman and Gordon Gray Award for excellence in teaching.

Ehrman currently serves as co-editor of the series New Testament Tools, Studies, and Documents (E. J. Brill), co-editor-in-chief for the journal Vigiliae Christianae, and on several other editorial boards for journals and monographs. Ehrman formerly served as president of the Southeast Region of the Society of Biblical Literature, chair of the New Testament textual criticism section of the society, book review editor of the Journal of Biblical Literature, and editor of the monograph series The New Testament in the Greek Fathers (Scholars Press).

Ehrman speaks extensively throughout the United States and has participated in many public debates, including debates with William Lane Craig, Dinesh D'Souza, Mike Licona, Craig A. Evans, Daniel B. Wallace, Richard Swinburne, Peter J. Williams, James White, Darrell Bock, Michael L. Brown, and Robert M. Price.

In 2006 he appeared on The Colbert Report and The Daily Show, to promote his book Misquoting Jesus, and in 2009 reappeared on The Colbert Report with the release of Jesus, Interrupted. Ehrman has appeared on the History Channel, the National Geographic Channel, Discovery Channel, A&E, Dateline NBC, CNN, and NPR's Fresh Air and his writings have been featured in Time, Newsweek, The New York Times, The New Yorker, and The Washington Post.

Works

Books
Ehrman has written widely on issues of the New Testament and early Christianity at both an academic and popular level, much of it based on textual criticism of the New Testament. His thirty books include three college textbooks and six New York Times bestsellers: Misquoting Jesus, Jesus, Interrupted, God's Problem, Forged, How Jesus Became God, and The Triumph of Christianity. More than two million copies of his books have been sold, and his books have been translated into 27 languages.

In The Orthodox Corruption of Scripture, Ehrman argues that there was a close relationship between the social history of early Christianity and the textual tradition of the emerging New Testament. He examines how early struggles between Christian "heresy" and "orthodoxy" affected the transmission of the documents. Ehrman is often considered a pioneer in connecting the history of the early church to textual variants within biblical manuscripts and in coining such terms as "proto-orthodox Christianity".

In Jesus: Apocalyptic Prophet of the New Millennium, Ehrman agrees with Albert Schweitzer's thesis that Jesus was a Jewish apocalyptic preacher and that his main message was that the end times were near, that God would shortly intervene to overthrow evil and establish his rule on Earth, and that Jesus and his disciples all believed these end time events would occur in their lifetimes.

In Truth and Fiction in The Da Vinci Code, Ehrman expands on his list of ten historical and factual inaccuracies in Dan Brown's novel, previously incorporated in Dan Burstein's Secrets of the Code.

In Misquoting Jesus, Ehrman outlines the development of New Testament manuscripts and the process and cause of manuscript errors in the New Testament.

In Jesus, Interrupted, he describes the progress scholars have made in understanding the Bible over the past two hundred years and the results of their study, which are often unknown among the population at large. He highlights the diversity of views found in the New Testament, the existence of forged books in the New Testament which were written in the names of the apostles by Christian writers who lived decades later, and his belief that Christian doctrines such as the suffering Messiah, the divinity of Jesus, and the Trinity were later inventions. To date, he has changed his mind on several issues, most notably the divinity of Jesus in the Synoptic Gospels.

In Forged, Ehrman posits that some New Testament books are literary forgeries and shows how widely forgery was practiced by early Christian writers—and how it was condemned in the ancient world as fraudulent and illicit. His scholarly book, Forgery and Counterforgery, is an advanced look at the practice of forgery in the New Testament and early Christian literature. It makes a case for considering falsely attributed or pseudepigraphic books in the New Testament and early Christian literature "forgery", looks at why certain New Testament and early Christian works are considered forged, and describes the broader phenomenon of pseudepigraphy in the Greco-Roman world.

In 2012, Ehrman published Did Jesus Exist? The Historical Argument for Jesus of Nazareth, defending the historical existence of Jesus of Nazareth in contrast to the mythicist theory that Jesus is an entirely fictitious being.

The 2014 release of How Jesus Became God: The Exaltation of a Jewish Preacher from Galilee examines the historical Jesus, who according to Ehrman neither thought of himself as God nor claimed to be God, and proffers how he came to be thought of as the incarnation of God himself.

In Jesus Before the Gospels, he examines the early Christian oral tradition and its role in shaping the stories about Jesus that are encountered in the New Testament.

The Triumph of Christianity: How a Forbidden Religion Swept the World notes that from the diversity of Christianity "throughout the first four Christian centuries," eventually only one form of Christianity, Nicene Christianity, became dominant under the rule of the Roman Emperor Constantine and his successors.

Heaven and Hell: A History of the Afterlife examines the historical development of the concepts of the afterlife throughout Greek, Jewish, and early Christian cultures, and how they eventually converged into the concepts of Heaven and Hell recognized by modern Christians.

Courses (on DVD/CD)
The New Testament (2000); The Great Courses—24 thirty minute lectures  
The Historical Jesus (2000); The Great Courses—24 thirty minute lectures
Lost Christianities: Christian Scriptures and the Battles over Authentication (2002); The Great Courses—24 thirty minute lectures
From Jesus to Constantine: A History of Early Christianity (2004); The Great Courses—24 thirty minute lectures
The History of the Bible: The Making of the New Testament Canon (2005); The Great Courses—12 thirty minute lectures 
After the New Testament: The Writings of the Apostolic Fathers (2005); The Great Courses—24 thirty minute lectures
The Greatest Controversies of Early Christian History (2013); The Great Courses—24 thirty minute lectures
How Jesus Became God (2014); The Great Courses—24 thirty minute lectures
The Triumph of Christianity (2021); The Great Courses—24 twenty-eight minute lectures

Reception
Ehrman has been the recipient of the 2009 J. W. Pope "Spirit of Inquiry" Teaching Award, the 1993 UNC Undergraduate Student Teaching Award, the 1994 Phillip and Ruth Hettleman Prize for Artistic and Scholarly Achievement, and the Bowman and Gordon Gray Award for excellence in teaching.

Daniel Wallace has praised Ehrman as "one of North America's leading textual critics" and describes him as "one of the most brilliant and creative textual critics I have ever known". Wallace argues, however, that in Misquoting Jesus Ehrman sometimes "overstates his case by assuming that his view is certainly correct." For example, Wallace asserts that Ehrman himself acknowledges the vast majority of textual variants are minor, but his popular writing and speaking sometimes makes the sheer number of them appear to be a major problem for getting to the original New Testament text.

Ehrman's The New Testament: A Historical Introduction to the Early Christian Writings is widely used at American colleges and universities. The textbook holds to a traditional interpretation of the Gospel of Thomas in the context of second-century Christian Gnosticism, a view that has been criticized by Elaine Pagels.

Andreas J. Köstenberger, Darrell L. Bock, and Josh D. Chatraw have disputed Ehrman's depiction of scholarly consensus, saying: "It is only by defining scholarship on his own terms and by excluding scholars who disagree with him that Ehrman is able to imply that he is supported by all other scholarship," but Michael R. Licona, notes that "his positions are those largely embraced by mainstream skeptical scholarship."

Gary Kamiya states in Salon that "Ehrman's scholarly standing did not soothe the evangelical Christians who were outraged by Misquoting Jesus. Angered by what they took to be the book's subversive import, they attacked it as exaggerated, unfair and lacking a devotional tone. No fewer than three books were published in response to Ehrman's tome". In 2014, Zondervan published How God Became Jesus: The Real Origins of Belief in Jesus' Divine Nature: A Response to Bart D. Ehrman as a planned companion volume to Ehrman's How Jesus Became God. The contributing authors—including Michael F. Bird, Craig A. Evans, and Simon Gathercole—present Ehrman as "prone to profound confusion, botched readings, and scholarly fictions." Bird writes, "For conservative Christians, Ehrman is a bit of a bogeyman, the Prof. Moriarty of biblical studies, constantly pressing an attack on their long-held beliefs about God, Jesus, and the Bible.... For secularists, the emerging generation of 'nones' (who claim no religion, even if they are not committed to atheism or agnosticism), Ehrman is a godsend."

Ehrman has participated in several debates on the topic of the historical reliability of the Gospels. This includes a 2014 debate with Protestant apologist, James White, and a 2022 debate with Roman Catholic apologist, Jimmy Akin.

References

Bibliography

Notes

Further reading

External links

 
 
 
 
 
 

1955 births
20th-century American essayists
20th-century American writers
21st-century American essayists
21st-century American non-fiction writers
21st-century American writers
Academic journal editors
American agnostics
American atheism activists
American biblical scholars
American former Protestants
American humanists
American male essayists
American male non-fiction writers
American religion academics
American social commentators
Critics of the Christ myth theory
Former evangelicals
Historians of Christianity
Living people
Moody Bible Institute alumni
New Testament scholars
People from Lawrence, Kansas
Philosophers of religion
Princeton Theological Seminary alumni
Secular humanists
University of North Carolina at Chapel Hill faculty
Wheaton College (Illinois) alumni
Writers about religion and science
Writers from Kansas